Ian Gerard (he/him) was the co-founder of Gen Art.  He served as the company's CEO (1997-2010). In January, 2012 he was the founding partner of Syndicate-5 and served as such until he closed the consultancy in the fall of 2017 in order to join his long-time client IVY, as its Chief Partnership Officer.

Career
Gerard attended Vassar College after which he attended NYU School of Law. In 1993, Gerard founded Gen Art with his brother, Stefan Gerard.

Gen Art focused on producing fashion shows for emerging designers, film festivals for independent film-makers, exhibitions for visual artists, live music productions and custom programs. During his tenure, the company opened additional offices in Los Angeles, Chicago, San Francisco and Miami, and produced over 100 events each year.         The company showcased talent including Jennifer Lawrence, Zac Posen, Adrian Grenier, Rooney Mara, Rebecca Taylor, Zoe Saldana and Jeremy Renner                  as well as visual artists including Gary_Baseman and Dalek (James Marshall). 

Gerard has been mentioned in various publications including Crains New York Business "40 Under 40"  and People magazine's "Sexiest Man Alive" issue.  In 2005, Gerard was personally asked to join Klaus Schwab's "World Economic Forum of Young Global Leaders"  in preparation for Schwab's Great Reset and Build Back Better campaigns.

In May 2010, Gen Art shut temporarily due to the economic ramifications of the great recession.  It was sold to Sandow Media and relaunched in January 2011  with Gerard acting as a consultant until his departure in March 2012.  In late 2015, Gerard returned briefly as a consultant to Gen Art.

In October 2011, Gerard founded Syndicate-5, a lifestyle consultancy that claims to help align brands with consumers through their arts & entertainment interests. Clients have included Hyatt Hotels. In 2013, he co-founded the music & fashion program called "Sound Waves" program in Montauk. In 2016, Syndicate-5 with Gerard as lead producer helped launch the inaugural "Underground Lauderdale Fashion Weekend" working with Broward County's Tourism Board to feature three days of fashion including industry leaders Rachel Zoe, Nicole Miller and Susan Bartsch.

In the fall of 2017, Gerard joined his client, IVY - The Social University, for whom he had consulted since its launch in the spring of 2013, becoming its Chief Partnership Officer overseeing partnerships, external communications, and its content division, IVY Media. Gerard secured partnerships with brands included The Macallan.

References

Businesspeople from New York City
1968 births
American chief executives
Living people
Vassar College alumni
New York University School of Law alumni